Taiwan Financial Holdings Co., Ltd. is a Taiwan based state-owned corporation that is the parent holding company of the Bank of Taiwan, BankTaiwan Securities and BankTaiwan Life Insurance.

Founded in 2007 and commenced in 2008 through the legislative approval of the merger, it is the largest financial institution in Taiwan. Today the Group is the 18th largest financial institution in Asia and 89th largest in the world, with assets of NT$5,458.59 billion and net worth of NT$373.17 billion as of March, 2008.

History
 In January 2008, the Bank of Taiwan became part of the Taiwan Financial Holdings Co., Ltd.(), which was resulted in the merger of the Bank of Taiwan, Land Bank of Taiwan, The Export–Import Bank of China, BankTaiwan Securities and BankTaiwan Life Insurance. This is now Taiwan's largest financial institution. The merger was filed report in accordance with the Fair Trade Law.
 On June 28, 2008, the Government of Taiwan approved a draft law which allowed Taiwan Financial Holdings to acquire other financial companies. The Government also approved the withdrawal of Export-Import Bank of China from the holding company.
 On July 21, 2008, the Government of Taiwan planned of a future release of 20% stake in the state-owned Taiwan Financial Holdings to foreign strategic partners and allowed them to join the company's board of directors. This will be effective once the ratification of the draft Statute for Taiwan Financial Holdings has been complete, scheduled on September 2008.

Merger and acquisitions
In 2008, the banks and financial institutions Bank of Taiwan, Land Bank of Taiwan, The Export-Import Bank of China, BankTaiwan Securities and BankTaiwan Life Insurance merged into a single parent holding company, Taiwan Financial Holdings Group.

Taiwan Financial Holdings Co. Ltd. filed a merger report in accordance with the Fair Trade Law under Article 6, 11 and 12. The merger report concluded that this will result in the possession of more than 15% of the deposit and loan market and there is no obvious danger of restriction on market competition. The report concluded that the meeting on October 4, 2007 decided the benefits brought by the merger outweigh the negative.

Subsidiaries
Asia Pacific
Bank of Taiwan
BankTaiwan Securities
BankTaiwan Life Insurance

See also

List of banks in Taiwan
Economy of Taiwan
List of companies of Taiwan

References

External links
Taiwan Financial Holdings Group (臺灣金控) 
Bank of Taiwan (臺灣銀行) 
Land Bank of Taiwan (臺灣土地銀行) 
BankTaiwan Securities (臺銀證券) 
BankTaiwan Life Insurance (臺銀人壽) 

Banks established in 2007
Banks of Taiwan
Companies based in Taipei
Government-owned companies of Taiwan
Holding companies established in 2007
Holding companies of Taiwan
Taiwanese companies established in 2007